Snakehips or Snake hips may refer to:

 Snakehips (duo), a British electronic/R&B music group
 Snake hips (dance), a blues dance movement involving rotating the hips
 Earl Snakehips Tucker (1905–1937), American dancer
 Ken Snakehips Johnson (1914–1941), British jazz band leader and dancer
 "Snake Hips", a 1994 song by Brand New Heavies from Brother Sister
 "Snake Hips", a 1995 song by The Future Sound of London from The Far-Out Son of Lung and the Ramblings of a Madman
 The hips of a snake

See also
 Hip (disambiguation)
 Snake (disambiguation)